Plumwood is a census-designated place in central Monroe Township, Madison County, Ohio, United States.  It lies at the intersection of State Route 38 with Arthur Bradley Road, 8½ miles (13½ km) north of the city of London, the county seat of Madison County.  The Spring Fork of the Little Darby Creek flows past the community.

Plumwood was originally laid out on December 23, 1895, by Charles F. Sanford.  The community was originally named Sanford, but the name was later changed.  As of 1915, the community was one of the largest trade posts in the county, with three large general stores, a blacksmith, six threshing outfits, three hay baling outfits, and the population was 200.

Demographics

References

Census-designated places in Madison County, Ohio